was a class of daimyō in the Tokugawa Shogunate of Japan who were certain relatives of the Shōgun. 

While all shinpan were relatives of the shōgun, not all relatives of the shōgun were shinpan; an example of this is the Matsudaira clan of the Okutono Domain. Non-daimyō relatives, such as the Gosankyō, were also known as kamon – thus the shinpan lords were alternatively known as kamon daimyō (家門大名). Shinpan included the Gosanke, the Matsudaira clan of Aizu and the Matsudaira clan of the Fukui Domain. These branch families were created after the 1600 Battle of Sekigahara; there were 23 shimpan domains, producing a total of approximately 2.6 million koku of rice.  Because they were family and thus could wield informal power, they were not permitted to hold official positions in the bakufu.  These families could also provide a shogunal successor if necessary.

See also 
 Fudai daimyō
 Tozama daimyō

References
 Japanese Wiki article on Shinpan (15 September 2007)

Further reading
Totman, Conrad. (1967). Politics in the Tokugawa bakufu, 1600–1843. Cambridge: Harvard University Press.
Peter Duus. (1976). The Rise of Modern Japan. Houghton-Mifflin Company. 
John W. Hall and Marius Jansen, eds. 1968. Studies in the institutional history of early modern Japan. Princeton, Princeton University Press.

Daimyo
Government of feudal Japan
Tokugawa clan